Lycée La Fontaine may refer to:
Lycée La Fontaine (Paris), France
Lycée La Fontaine (Niger)